Zethus is a very large, mainly neotropical genus of potter wasps with some species representation also in the Nearctic, Afrotropical, Australian and Indomalayan regions.

The genus is subdivided into a few subgenera which nevertheless need a phylogenetic analysis in order to recognize their natural limits.

Species
See the separate list of Zethus species.

References

 Bohart, R. M. and L. A. Stange. 1965. A revision of the genus Zethus Fabricius in the Western Hemisphere (Hymenoptera: Eumenidae). Univ. Calif. Publ. Entomol. 40: 1–208.

External links
 Zethus spp., mason wasps of Florida on the UF / IFAS Featured Creatures Web site

Potter wasps
Hymenoptera genera